The  is a monument for peace to commemorate Sadako Sasaki and the thousands of child victims of the atomic bombing of Hiroshima.  This monument is located in Hiroshima, Japan. Sadako Sasaki, a young girl, died of leukemia from radiation of the atomic bomb dropped on Hiroshima on 6 August 1945.

Overview

The monument is located in Hiroshima Peace Memorial Park in Hiroshima, Japan. Designed by native artists Kazuo Kikuchi and Kiyoshi Ikebe, the monument was built using money derived from a fund-raising campaign by Japanese school children, including Sadako Sasaki's classmates, with the main statue entitled "Atomic Bomb Children". The statue was unveiled on 5 May 1958, the Japanese Children's Day holiday. Sadako Sasaki, who died of an atomic bomb disease radiation poisoning is immortalized at the top of the statue, where she holds a wire crane above her head. Shortly before she passed, she had a vision to create a thousand cranes. Japanese tradition says that if one creates a thousand cranes, they are granted one wish.  Sadako's wish was to have a world without nuclear weapons. Thousands of origami cranes from all over the world are offered around the monument. They serve as a sign that the children who make them and those who visit the statue desire a world without nuclear war, having been tied to the statue by the story that Sadako died from radiation-induced leukemia after folding just under a thousand cranes, wishing for world peace. However, an exhibit which appeared in the Hiroshima Peace Memorial Museum stated that by the end of August 1955, Sadako had achieved her 1000-crane goal and continued to fold more cranes. Unfortunately, her wish was not granted and she died of the leukemia on October 25, 1955. Her main reason of death was from the radiation poisoning from the atomic bomb Little Boy.

Monument

Beneath the main structure hangs a bronze crane that works as a wind chime when pushed against a traditional peace bell from which it is suspended. The two pieces were donated by Nobel Prize winner, Hideki Yukawa.

At the base of the monument is a black marble slab on which is inscribed in Japanese:

The figures that surround the monument are angels, representing that Sadako is in heaven among the other fallen angels who died during the atomic bombing in Hiroshima.

Today, people all around the world have the opportunity to donate cranes that they have folded in honor of Sadako and the others.  The paper crane is a symbol of peace, which was her last dying wish.

See also

Hiroshima Witness

References

  
 https://web.archive.org/web/20160512231455/http://www.city.hiroshima.lg.jp/www/contents/1110438305305/index.html

External links
The Children's Peace Monument
Paper Cranes and the Children's Peace Monument

Monuments and memorials concerning the atomic bombings of Hiroshima and Nagasaki
Monuments and memorials in Japan
Peace monuments and memorials
Tourist attractions in Hiroshima
Buildings and structures in Hiroshima
1958 establishments in Japan